Zargarian Synagogue is a synagogue located in the Amir Abad neighborhood of Tehran. With an increase in the number of Jews in Amirabad street, Abdullah Zargarian decided to create the synagogue in 1350 SH (1971–1972 AD). He found a suitable piece of property south of Keshavarz (Elizabeth) Boulevard and he approached the Tehran Jewish Committee with his proposal. He received help from Musa Barlaavi, Esmail Khodadadi, and Musa Sassooni. The Tehran Jewish Committee and the Jews of Tehran helped him in his endeavors and the head of Alliance israélite universelle in Iran, Mr. Cohenka, pledged help if Abdullah Zargarian creates an Alliance school as well. The plan was fetched and it was sent to the Alliance israélite universelle headquarters in France and after 45 days Manuchehr Kohan was selected as the chief architect. The plan started in 1350 AH and was finished in 1352 AH (1973–1974 AD).
The synagogue was constructed by Manuchehr Kohan and Hoshang Hassidim in four floors and can hold 500 people. Abdullah Daghighian was selected as the principal of the Alliance school by the Alliance headquarters in France.

References 

Synagogues in Tehran